The Godson is a 1998 comedy film directed by Bob Hoge, starring Rodney Dangerfield, Kevin McDonald and Dom DeLuise. The film is a parody of The Godfather film series and Scarface, as well as other gangster films that were popular in the 1970s, 1980s, and 1990s.

Cast
Rodney Dangerfield as The Rodfather
Kevin McDonald as Guppy Calzone (credited as Kevin Hamilton McDonald)
Dom DeLuise as The Oddfather
Fabiana Udenio as Don Na
Lou Ferrigno as Bugsy/Alice
Paul Greenberg as Frito Calzone
Carol DeLuise as Mama Calzone (as Carol Arthur)
Barbara Crampton as Goldy
Bob Hoge as Sunny Calzone (as Bob 'The Sicilian Salami' Hoge)
Pat Crawford Brown as Toenail Lady
Bobbie Brown as Sunny's Babe

Reception
As it is a direct-to-video release, there were few critical reviews. On IMDb, it maintains a 3.4 approval rating. The soundtrack features music from Del Noah and the Mt. Ararat Finks with Eric Wilson of Sublime on double bass.

External links

1998 films
American parody films
American crime comedy films
1990s parody films
Mafia comedy films
1990s crime comedy films
1998 comedy films
Parody films based on The Godfather
1990s English-language films
1990s American films